Twelve is the second album by Cobalt 60, a side-project of Front 242's Jean-Luc De Meyer.

Track listing

Personnel

Cobalt 60
 Jean-Luc De Meyer – vocals, machines, mixing
 Dominique Lallement – machines
 Robert Wilcocks – guitar, machines, production, mixing

Additional musicians
 Mark McCleeryey – additional percussion (1, 7, 10)
 Judith Morelle – vocals (10)
 Holly Rodgers – guitar (5)
 Olivier Simon – guitar (2, 4, 7, 12)
 The Heathfield Choir – vocals (12)
 Jens Schröder – engineering
 Gerd Schröder – artwork
 Fredrik Clement – baby portrait

1998 albums